Training wheels (or stabilisers in British English and Hiberno-English) are an additional wheel or wheels mounted parallel to the rear wheel of a bicycle that assist learners until they have developed a usable sense of balance on the bicycle. Typically they are used in teaching very young children to ride a bike, although versions for adults exist.

Learning to bicycle
Training wheels that prevent the bike from leaning also prevent countersteering, so that, as with a tricycle, children learn to turn the handlebars the wrong way, which must be unlearned later. Sheldon Brown wrote that training wheels can become an obstacle to learning if they are adjusted incorrectly, because they prevent the bike from leaning if they are too low, and can inhibit braking if too much weight is taken off the rear wheel by training wheels that are too low. Adjusting training wheels correctly, and raising them higher as the child's skill increases, avoids these problems. Many modern kids' bikes, however, are not compatible with training wheels. Alternatives to using training wheels include removing the pedals from a child's bike, or balance bicycles. USA Cycling President Derek Bouchard-Hall stated in a Wall Street Journal article that balance bikes "have made training wheels obsolete."

See also
 Outline of cycling

References 

Bicycle wheels